The Freedom Monument is a memorial in Riga, Latvia, honouring soldiers killed during the Latvian War of Independence (1918–1920).

Freedom Monument may also refer to:

Freedom Monument (Tbilisi), Georgia
Freedom Monument (Baghdad), Iraq
Freedom Monument (Kaunas), Lithiania
Freedom Monument (Trujillo), Peru
Freedom Monument (Bydgoszcz), Poland

See also
Statue of Freedom
Statue of Liberty (disambiguation)
Monument of Liberty (disambiguation)
Liberty Monument (disambiguation)